This is a list of islands of England (excluding the mainland which is itself a part of the island of Great Britain), as well as a table of the largest English islands by area and by population.

Islands by type and name

Offshore and inshore islands

To group islands by geographical region, sort the table by "Island Group/Location" (click the icon by the column heading).

Inland islands

There are numerous islands within freshwater lakes and rivers in England. They are most numerous in the Lake District but other concentrations occur within the Norfolk Broads, some major reservoirs and principal rivers.

In the Lake District

To group islands by lake, sort the table by "Lake" (click the icon by the column heading).

In the River Thames

See: Islands in the River Thames

Inland islands elsewhere in England

To group islands by location, sort the table by "Location" (click the icon by the column heading).

Largest islands

Most populous islands

Places called "island" or "isle" that are not islands
Some places in the British Isles are called islands or isles, but are not. Some of these were formerly islands surrounded by marshland. Others are peninsulas or just coastal settlements. They include:
Isle of Athelney
Isle of Axholme
Barrow Island
Brown's Island, Rutland Water
Cobholm Island, part of Great Yarmouth
Isle of Dogs
Isle of Elmley part of Sheppey
Isle of Ely
Isle of Grain
Isle of Harty part of Sheppey
Isle of Oxney
Isle of Portland
Isle of Purbeck
Kelham Island
Ramsey Island
Spike Island
Stones Island, Carsington Water, Derbyshire
Sunk Island
Isle of Thanet, formerly separated by the Wantsum Channel
The Isle, within tight loop of the River Severn, Shropshire
The Island
Thorney Island, Cambridgeshire
Isle of Wedmore

See also
List of islands of Scotland
List of islands of Wales
List of islands of Ireland
List of islands of the British Isles
List of islands of the United Kingdom

References

 
England
Islands of England
England